Bahrain is an island country in the Middle East.

Bahrain may also refer to:
Bahrain (historical region) or Eastern Arabia, a historic region in the Middle East
Bahrain Island, an island in the archipelago of Bahrain
Bahrain, Iran or Dorud, a city in Iran
Bahrain, Swat, a town in Pakistan
Bahrain (union council), an administrative unit in the Swat district, Pakistan